The Islandmagee witch trial took place in 1710–1711 in Islandmagee, Ireland. It is believed to have been the last witch trial to take place in Ireland.

In March 1711, in Carrickfergus, County Antrim, eight women were put on trial and found guilty of witchcraft. The women were put in stocks and then jailed for one year. The trial was the result of a claim by Mrs. James Haltridge that 18-year-old Mary Dunbar exhibited signs of demonic possession such as "shouting, swearing, blaspheming, throwing Bibles, going into fits every time a clergyman came near her and vomiting household items such as pins, buttons, nails, glass and wool". Assisted by local authorities, Dunbar picked out eight women she claimed were witches that had attacked her in spectral form.

Court case
The case was presided over by two High Court judges, Anthony Upton and James Macartney. It is interesting that in their summing up to the jury they took radically different views of the evidence. Upton urged the jury to acquit: he did not take the modern view that there are no witches, but stressed the blameless lives of the accused and their exemplary attendance at Christian worship: was it likely that they also practised witchcraft? Macartney, however, took a more credulous view and successfully urged the jury to convict.

During the arrest of the eight, they were set upon by a frenzied mob and one of the accused lost an eye. On release, all of the women were ostracized from the community.

Historians' comments and fate of records
According to Andrew Sneddon, history lecturer at University of Ulster, "Mary Dunbar was making up the whole thing". Sneddon wrote that "Mary Dunbar learned the part of a demoniac from accounts about Salem or Scotland, or someone told her about it. Remember, this was a time when people were pouring in from Scotland".

Records of what happened to Mary Dunbar or those convicted of witchcraft may have been lost when the Public Records Office in question was burned down during the Irish Civil War.

Proposed memorial
A memorial to the eight women convicted was proposed by the author Martina Devlin. However the memorial was objected to by TUV councillor Jack McKee who believed the plaque could become a "shrine to paganism" and furthermore stated that he wasn't convinced the women weren't guilty and that he believed the proposal to be "anti-god".

See also 
 Florence Newton

References 

 Summers, Montague.  Geography of Witchcraft, 1927, pp. 96–98.
 Seymour, John D. Irish Witchcraft and Demonology, 1913, pp. 207–221.
 Islandmagee entry at Antrim.net

Witch trials in Europe
1711 in law
1711 in Ireland
18th-century trials
History of County Antrim
Trials in Ireland